Hemitragus bonali, the Bonal tahr, is an extinct species of bovid from the Pleistocene of Europe and the Caucasus mountains region.

The most recent remains of the Bonal tahr were found in layers dating from 298,000 ± 55,000 ka.
The Bonal tahr was closely related (and possibly ancestral to) another extinct European tahr species, Hemitragus cedrensis.

References

Prehistoric even-toed ungulates
Pleistocene even-toed ungulates
Prehistoric bovids
Pleistocene mammals of Europe